The Rochdale Hornets were a British speedway team from Rochdale in the north west of England.

History
They were founded in 1928 and competed in the inaugural season of British Speedway in 1929 but closed in 1930.

In 1970, they were reformed by the promotion from the Belle Vue Aces to give their junior riders a chance to progress when they moved their Belle Vue Colts team to the stadium under the control of Dent Oliver.

The team arrived in 1970 but moved on to Ellesmere Port at the end of the 1971 season. The track was not a good shape and proved to be unpopular with supporters. The safety fence was unusual in that it was made of steel plates supported on wire ropes. The most famous rider to progress from the Hornets was 1976 World Champion Peter Collins.

Season summary

References

Defunct British speedway teams